George Gillis Haanen (23. August 1807 - 17 July 1879) was a 19th-century landscape painter from the Northern Netherlands.

Biography
He was born in Utrecht as the son of the painter and paper silhouette cutter Casparis Haanen, and brother of the painters Adriana Johanna Haanen, Elisabeth Alida Haanen and Remigius Adrianus Haanen. He became a member of "Arti Sacrum" in 1831 in Rotterdam, and became a member of the Royal Academy of Amsterdam in 1835. He traveled and worked along the Rhine and Austria, and is known for landscapes. He died in Bilsen.

References

External links
	
George Gillis Haanen on Artnet	
	

1807 births
1879 deaths
19th-century Dutch painters
Dutch male painters
Dutch landscape painters
Artists from Utrecht
19th-century Dutch male artists